Pina Renzi (16 December 1901 – 13 July 1984) was an Italian film actress. She appeared in more than 50 films between 1933 and 1959. She also directed one film, Cercasi bionda bella presenza, in 1942. She was born in Morciano di Romagna, Italy and died in Riccione, Italy.

Selected filmography

 The Girl with the Bruise (1933)
 La segretaria per tutti (1933)
 God's Will Be Done (1936)
 The Amnesiac (1936)
 The Ferocious Saladin (1937)
 For Men Only (1938)
 We Were Seven Sisters (1939)
 It Always Ends That Way (1939)
 Two Million for a Smile (1939)
 At Your Orders, Madame (1939)
 The Sin of Rogelia Sanchez (1940)
 Maddalena, Zero for Conduct (1940)
 A Husband for the Month of April (1941)
 A Living Statue (1943)
 The Son of the Red Corsair (1943)
 Accidents to the Taxes!! (1951)
 The Two Sergeants (1951)
 Matrimonial Agency (1953)
 The Enchanting Enemy (1953)
 The Three Thieves (1954)

References

External links

1901 births
1984 deaths
Italian film actresses
Italian film directors
Italian women film directors
People from Forlì
20th-century Italian actresses